E–The Environmental Magazine, or simply E, is an environmental magazine aimed at a readership concerned about the environment, and those who want to know what they can do to make a difference.  It has won and been nominated for 13 Independent Press Awards. In print from 1990-2013, the archive of back issues is now available at emagazine.com, with new editorial content provided by its sister site, EarthTalk.org, the online home of the internationally syndicated EarthTalk Q&A column. 

The nonprofit (501-c-3) organization Earth Action Network, Inc. maintains emagazine.com and publishes new content via EarthTalk.org and its network of 1,300+ media outlets across North America.

E: The Environmental Magazine and EarthTalk cover the following areas of interest:

Air and water quality
Forests and Waterways
Biodiversity
Oceans and fisheries
Biotechnology
Human population growth impacts
Climate change
Recycling and re-Use
Endangered wildlife
Toxic health threats
Food safety
Transportation and energy issues

References

Bimonthly magazines published in the United States
Environmental magazines
Magazines established in 1988
Magazines published in Connecticut